Halib Mentel, also referred to as Halibmentel or Halimentel, is a village in Eritrea.

Overview

Halib Mentel mostly consists of round huts, known as tukuls, and has a large Catholic church. The village is on the trackbed of the Eritrean Railway, between Asmara and Keren. The railway closed in 1975, though there are plans to re-open it.

References

Villages in Eritrea